is a Japanese ice hockey goaltender and member of the Japanese national team, currently playing with Daishin IHC in the Women's Japan Ice Hockey League (WJIHL) and the All-Japan Women's Ice Hockey Championship.

Playing career
In addition to playing with Daishin IHC, Kawaguchi plays with the ice hockey team of her secondary school,  in Kushiro, Hokkaido, Japan.

International play
As a junior player with the Japanese national under-18 team, she participated in the 2022 IIHF U18 Women's World Championship Division I Group A. Kawaguchi played just over a third of Japan’s minutes in net and recorded a shutout against France. The goaltending tandem of Kawaguchi and Ririna Takenaka backstopped Japan’s whitewash of the tournament, as both net minders denied every shot against to record perfect 0.00 goals against average.

Kawaguchi debuted with the senior national team at the 2022 IIHF Women's World Championship. Serving as third goaltender behind Miyuu Masuhara and Akane Konishi, she dressed for two games and played as Konishi's relief in the preliminary round game against , facing 36 shots in 32:13 minutes played.

References

External links
 
 KAWAGUCHI Riko at the Japan Ice Hockey Federation 

2004 births
Living people
Japanese women's ice hockey goaltenders
People from Kushiro, Hokkaido
Sportspeople from Hokkaido
WJIHL players